Fixer (stylized as FIXER) is the 24th studio album by Japanese singer Akina Nakamori and first studio album to be released during the 2010s. It was released on 30 December 2015 under the Universal Music Japan label. It's Nakamori's first original albums after a hiatus of six years.

The album includes Akina's original written songs: "Fixer (While the Women Are Sleeping)" and "Rojo (Tierra)". The album includes both original and renewed version of the songs.

The album was released in regular and limited editions. Limited edition includes a music video clip of Fixer: While the Woman Are Sleeping.

Promotion

Singles
It consists of two previously released singles.

Rojo Tierra is the forty ninth single. It was released on 25 January 2015 under Universal Music Japan. It was her first single to be released in 5 years. Before release, Nakamori performed it on 65th NHK Kōhaku Uta Gassen from recording studio in United States in early morning. It was also Nakamori's Kōhaku appearance for first time in 12 years. The single debuted at number 8 on Oricon Single Weekly Charts.

Unfixable is the fiftieth single. It was released on 30 September 2015 under Universal Music Japan. It was her second single to be released in that year. The single debuted at number 20 on Oricon Single Weekly Charts.

In 2016, the album track "Fixer (While the Women Are Sleeping)" was released as a single. The single version was used as a theme song to the film While the Women Are Sleeping.

Chart performance
The album reached number 7 on the Oricon Album Weekly Chart with the sales of 14,000 copies.

Track listing

References

2015 albums
Japanese-language albums
Akina Nakamori albums
Universal Music Japan albums